Events from the year 1174 in Ireland.

Events
 Battle of Thurles Loughtagalla: 1174 Donal Mór Ó Brian defeats a Norman incursion into Thomond.

Deaths
 27 March – Gilla Meic Liac mac Diarmata, Archbishop of Armagh
 Machabeo, an Irish monk and saint, abbot of Armagh's monastery of Saint Peter and Saint Paul for over thirty years.

Births

References